Vilis Lācis (May 12, 1904 – February 6, 1966) was a Latvian writer and communist politician.

Lācis was born Jānis Vilhelms Lāce into a working-class family in Vecmīlgrāvis (now part of Riga). During World War I, his family fled to the Altai region in Siberia, where Lācis studied at the pedagogical seminary in Barnaul. In 1921, Lācis returned to Riga and at various times worked as a fisherman, port worker, ship's fireman and librarian while writing in his free time. In 1933, he published his hugely successful novel Zvejnieka dēls ('Fisherman's Son'), making him one of the most popular and commercially successful Latvian writers of the 1930s. His novels have been characterized as popular fiction, not always liked by highbrow critics, but widely read by ordinary people. 

Throughout this period, Lācis maintained underground ties to the officially banned Communist Party of Latvia. Lācis was under periodic surveillance by the Latvian secret services due to his political activities. Eventually, Lācis became a favorite of Latvian president Karlis Ulmanis, who personally ordered the destruction of the surveillance files on Lācis. Lācis wrote newspaper editorials highly favorable of the Ulmanis regime, while still remaining a Communist supporter, and Ulmanis's government generously funded Lācis's writing and a film adaptation of 'Fisherman's Son'. During the Soviet period, eight films based on Lācis's works were produced, including a new adaptation of 'Fisherman's Son' in 1957.

After Latvia was occupied and forcefully incorporated in the USSR in August 1940, Lācis became Chairman of the Council of Ministers of the Latvian SSR (nominally, Prime Minister) and served in this position from 1940 to 1959. When Nazi Germany occupied Latvia from 1941 to 1944, Lācis was evacuated to Moscow, where he continued to write in a socialist realist style. He was regarded mostly as a figurehead, as most of the actual decisions were made by the Central Committee of the Communist Party. As first Minister of the Interior and then Chairman of the Supreme Soviet, he must take personal responsibility for the Stalinist deportations and other aspects of the police state, and signed orders for the arrest and deportation of over 40,000 people. 

From 1954 to 1958, Lācis also served as Chairman of the Soviet of Nationalities. He was awarded the Order of Lenin seven times and the Stalin Prize twice, in 1949 and 1952.

Lācis's books have been translated into more than 50 languages, with translations into Russian being the most numerous. He remains the most translated Latvian writer. He was among the contributors of semi-official literary magazine Karogs.

References

External links

1904 births
1966 deaths
Writers from Riga
Politicians from Riga
People from Kreis Riga
Central Committee of the Communist Party of the Soviet Union candidate members
Communist Party of Latvia politicians
Heads of government of the Latvian Soviet Socialist Republic
Ministers of the Interior of Latvia
Deputies of the People's Saeima
Members of the Supreme Soviet of the Latvian Soviet Socialist Republic, 1947–1951
Chairmen of the Soviet of Nationalities
First convocation members of the Soviet of Nationalities
Second convocation members of the Soviet of Nationalities
Third convocation members of the Soviet of Nationalities
Fourth convocation members of the Soviet of Nationalities
Fifth convocation members of the Soviet of Nationalities
Soviet writers
Latvian Marxist writers
People's Writers of the Latvian SSR
Stalin Prize winners
Recipients of the Order of Lenin